The 1974 United States Senate election in Hawaii took place on November 5, 1974. Incumbent Democratic U.S. Senator Daniel Inouye was re-elected to a third term in office, easily defeating People's Party nominee James Kimmel.

People's Party primary

Candidates
 Floyd Bernier-Nachtwey
 James D. Kimmel

Results

General election

Results

See also 
 1974 United States Senate elections

References

1974
Hawaii
United States Senate
Daniel Inouye